is a former Japanese football player.

Playing career
Morita was born in Kumamoto Prefecture on May 18, 1978. After graduating from University of Teacher Education Fukuoka, he joined J2 League club Sagan Tosu in 2001. He played many matches as forward from first season and became a regular player in 2002 season. In 2003, he moved to J2 club Albirex Niigata. Although Albirex won the champions in 2003 season and was promoted to J1 League from 2004 season, he could not play many matches. In July 2004, he moved to J2 club Omiya Ardija. After the transfer, he played all 21 matches except 1 match for suspension and scored 10 goals in 2004 season. Ardija also won the 2nd place in 2004 season and was promoted to J1. Although the club results were sluggish in J1, he played many matches every season. In 2009, he moved to J2 club Ventforet Kofu and played many matches. In 2010, he moved to Thai club Thai Port. In July 2010, he returned to Japan and joined Japan Football League club V-Varen Nagasaki. He retired end of 2010 season.

Club statistics

References

External links

1978 births
Living people
University of Teacher Education Fukuoka alumni
Association football people from Kumamoto Prefecture
Japanese footballers
J1 League players
J2 League players
Japan Football League players
Sagan Tosu players
Albirex Niigata players
Omiya Ardija players
Ventforet Kofu players
V-Varen Nagasaki players
Expatriate footballers in Thailand
Association football forwards